US Post Office-Waverly is a historic post office building located at Waverly in Tioga County, New York.  It was designed and built in 1936–1937 and is one of a number of post offices in New York State designed by the Office of the Supervising Architect of the Treasury Department, Louis A. Simon. It is a one-story, five-bay, steel-frame building clad in yellow/buff-colored brick on a raised foundation executed in the Colonial Revival style.  The interior features a 1939 mural by artist Musa McKim titled "Spanish Hill and the Early Inhabitants of the Vicinity."

It was listed on the National Register of Historic Places in 1988.

References

Waverly
Colonial Revival architecture in New York (state)
Government buildings completed in 1936
Buildings and structures in Tioga County, New York
National Register of Historic Places in Tioga County, New York